Armen Artavazdi Abaghian (January 1, 1933 in Stepanakert, Nagorno-Karabakh – November 18, 2005 in Moscow, Russia) was a Russian-Armenian specialist on nuclear power, Doctor of Technical Sciences, Professor (1985), Corresponding Member of the Russian Academy of Sciences. In 1984, he became the general director of "Energy" scientific and industrial state holding and the director of All-Soviet (then Russian) Institute of Atomic Energy Stations (AES). Then he became the deputy director of Rosenergoatom, a member of IAEA Consultative Committee.

He finished the Moscow Engineering Physics Institute in 1956. His works are dedicated to the mathematical models of AES blocks, their security and anti-crisis information data-centers.

Sources
Armenian Concise Encyclopedia, Ed. by acad. K. Khudaverdian, Yerevan, 1990, Vol. 1, p. 7

External links
Abaghian's death

1933 births
2005 deaths
People from Stepanakert
Corresponding Members of the Russian Academy of Sciences
International Atomic Energy Agency officials
Moscow Engineering Physics Institute alumni
Recipients of the Medal of the Order "For Merit to the Fatherland" II class
Recipients of the Order of Friendship of Peoples
Recipients of the Order of the Red Banner of Labour
Armenian scientists
Russian people of Armenian descent
Soviet Armenians
Burials in Troyekurovskoye Cemetery